The men's freestyle 66 kilograms is a competition featured at the 2010 World Wrestling Championships, and was held at the Olympic Stadium in Moscow, Russia on 12 September.

Results
Legend
F — Won by fall

Finals

Top half

Section 1

Section 2

Bottom half

Section 3

Section 4

Repechage

References
Results Book, Pages 86–87

Men's freestyle 66 kg